The 2010 Due Ponti Cup was a professional tennis tournament played on outdoor red clay courts. It was part of the 2010 ATP Challenger Tour. It took place in Rome, Italy between 31 May and 6 June 2010.

ATP entrants

Seeds

 Rankings are as of May 24, 2010.

Other entrants
The following players received wildcards into the singles main draw:
  Francesco Aldi
  Marco Crugnola
  Thomas Fabbiano
  Santiago González

The following players received entry into the singles main draw as an alternate:
  Martín Alund

The following players received entry from the qualifying draw:
  Facundo Bagnis
  Alberto Brizzi
  Daniele Giorgini
  Guido Pella

The following player received the lucky loser spot:
  Karim Maamoun

Champions

Singles

 Filippo Volandri def.  Reda El Amrani, 6–3, 6–2

Doubles

 Santiago González /  Travis Rettenmaier def.  Sadik Kadir /  Purav Raja, 6–2, 6–4

References
Italian Tennis Federation official website
ITF search 

Due Ponti Cup
Tennis tournaments in Italy